The Palatine Forest Mountain Bike Park in the Palatinate Forest is a mountain bike trail network in Germany, in the centre of the biosphere reserve of the Palatinate Forest-North Vosges. The network was opened in April 2005.

Routes 
The signposted, single-track routes differ in the grade of challenge:
 Route 1, starting at Rodalben, 54 km, with a 9.8 km, single-track section
 Route 2, starting at Waldfischbach-Burgalben, 48 km, with a 6.8 km single-track section
 Route 3, starting at Schopp, 67 km, with a 9.7 km single-track section
 Route 4, starting at Hochspeyer, 64 km, with a 14.3 km single-track section
 Route 5, starting at Lambrecht, 74 km, with a 12.5 km single-track section

Responsibility 
The Tourist Board of the Palatinate Forest region, especially the municipalities of Kaiserslautern-Süd, Lambrecht, Rodalben, Waldfischbach-Burgalben, and Hochspeyer, developed the project with the support of the regional forest commission and the University of Kaiserslautern. 

The park's administrative headquarters are in the collective municipality of Kaiserslautern-Süd.

External links 
 Home page of the Mountain Bike Park

Mountain biking venues
Geography of Rhineland-Palatinate
Tourist attractions in Rhineland-Palatinate
Parks in Germany